The list of ship decommissionings in 2012 includes a chronological list of ships decommissioned in 2012.


See also

References

2012
 
Ship